Your Move is the eleventh studio album by American folk rock duo America, released by Capitol Records on June 3, 1983.

History

In 1982, America experienced renewed commercial success with the hit album View From The Ground. Two of the tracks on that album, including the Top 10 single "You Can Do Magic," were written and produced by Russ Ballard. Desiring to maintain their commercial momentum, Gerry Beckley and Dewey Bunnell turned to Ballard once again, this time to produce their entire follow-up album.

Beckley and Bunnell began work on the new album by trading songs with Ballard. The recording sessions, however, did not end up as planned. Beckley recalls:

"We thought we were involved in the process, but [when] we got over to London, [Ballard] had cut a lot of the songs that we had nixed, and it became apparent that it was going to be a kind of 75/25 thing, where most of the songs were going to be his.  So we were very removed from this album.  We did our best to sing these songs as good as we could, but even on the songs we wrote, he basically played all the instruments."

This time around, it was America's input with Ballard that led to a hit single. One of the songs written by Ballard, called "The Border", had potential, but Bunnell was dissatisfied with its lyrics.  "Because he was very British, [Ballard] had used some cliche lyrics that, to us as Americans, sounded incongruous," Bunnell remembered.  "He was trying to get a desperado-type feel but used words like Pasadena.  The lyrics just didn't get the whole border thing and that Mexicali feel that he was envisioning.  I asked to rewrite it, and he was receptive, so I wrote a story about running away and trying to escape something."

The album included a number of Ballard-penned ballads, including "She's A Runaway," "Tonight Is For Dreamers," "Honey,"  and "Don't Let Me Be Lonely," along with the upbeat "My Kinda Woman."  "Cast The Spirit," which had originally appeared on Ballard's 1978 album At The Third Stroke, was a more hard-edged entry.  Bearing lead vocals by Bunnell, it became the album's second single, but failed to make a dent in the charts.

Bunnell's sole composition for the album was the psychedelic-tinged "My Dear." The album ended with "Someday Woman," an acoustic-driven track written by Beckley, Bill Mumy, and Robert Haimer.

Your Move was first issued in the CD format in the United States by the now-defunct One Way Records in 1998.

Reception

The album was released in June 1983. "The Border", featuring Bunnell's reworked lyrics, strings by the Royal Philharmonic Orchestra and an energetic saxophone solo by Raphael Ravenscroft, hit number 33 on the Billboard singles chart - what would turn out to be America's last Top 40 pop hit to date.  The single fared far better on adult contemporary radio, peaking at number 4.  This even bettered "You Can Do Magic," which had peaked at number 5 on the adult contemporary charts the year before.  However, lacking a major hit single, Your Move was unable to replicate the success of View From The Ground, peaking at number 81 on the Billboard album charts.  With that, America's collaboration with Ballard came to an end.

Allmusic's retrospective review panned the album, asserting that it follows the trends of 1983 pop radio but fails to show any inspiration. They singled out "The Border" as the one strong piece on the album, concluding "There's a distinct lack of spark in the material, production, and performance".

The song "Love's Worn Out Again" was a hit in the Philippines in the '80s and remains to be one of the known America songs in the country to this date.

Track listing

Personnel 

America
 Gerry Beckley – lead vocals, backing vocals 
 Dewey Bunnell – lead vocals, backing vocals

Additional musicians
 Russ Ballard – keyboards, guitars, bass, drums, percussion, backing vocals 
 Raphael Ravenscroft – saxophones 
 The Royal Philharmonic Orchestra – strings
 Louis Clark – string arrangements and conductor 
 Barry Griffiths – orchestra leader
 Stephen Bishop – backing vocals (2)

Production 
 Russ Ballard – producer 
 John Stanley – executive producer 
 Dennis Hertzendorfer – engineer 
 Patrice Carroll – assistant engineer 
 Danny Dawson – assistant engineer 
 Ian Grimble – assistant engineer 
 Mike Fuller – mastering 
 Roy Kohara – art direction 
 Hy Fujita – design 
 Henry Diltz – cover photography, calligraphy 
 Mike Hashimoto – liner photography 
 Katz-Gallin-Morey – management

Charts

References

America (band) albums
Capitol Records albums
1983 albums
Albums produced by Russ Ballard